Torulene dioxygenase (CAO-2, CarT) is an enzyme with systematic name torulene:oxygen oxidoreductase. This enzyme catalyses the following chemical reaction

 torulene + O2  4'-apo-beta, psi-caroten-4'-al + 3-methylbut-2-enal

It is assumed that 3-methylbut-2-enal is formed.

References

External links 
 

EC 1.13.11